MT3D is a family of finite-difference groundwater mass transport modeling software, often used with MODFLOW. The first generation, MT3D, was developed by Chunmiao Zheng in 1990, and most recently released by the U.S. Geological Survey with MT3D-USGS.

Versions 

 MT3D
 Appeared in 1990.
 MT3DMS
 Second generation, released in 1998. Improved to simulate multiple species.
 MT3D-USGS
 Third generation, released in 2016. Improved to support new transport modeling capabilities from MODFLOW.

References

Hydrology models
Hydrogeology software
United States Geological Survey
Geology software for Linux
Public-domain software